The National Cannabis Summit is an annual cannabis conference, presented by the National Cannabis Industry Association. The inaugural event was held at Denver's Colorado Convention Center in 2014.

See also
 Cannabis in Colorado

References

External links

 

2014 establishments in the United States
Cannabis events in the United States
Recurring events established in 2014